Got RIO? Romantic Warriors II: Special Features DVD is a 2013 documentary film and an addendum to the 2012 feature-length documentary Romantic Warriors II: A Progressive Music Saga About Rock in Opposition. The film was written and directed by Adele Schmidt and José Zegarra Holder, and was released in the United States by Zeitgeist Media. It was generally well received by critics, with a reviewer at AllMusic saying that it "is a showcase for tremendous musicianship and a must-have for existing [Rock in Opposition] fans".

The Special Features DVD consists of additional material filmed during the making of, but not used in, the original Romantic Warriors II. Unlike its predecessor, the DVD is not narrated, and features 60 minutes of live performance videos by eight of the bands that appear in the original film, followed by 40 minutes of additional interview clips of people interviewed in the first Romantic Warriors II.

Reception

Dave Lynch at AllMusic welcomed the one hour's worth of live performance videos on the Special Features DVD, which he said made up for the "short performance snippets" in the original documentary. He was impressed by the music, particularly Yugen's "Becchime", which he called "astounding". Lynch said that the DVD "is a showcase for tremendous musicianship and a must-have for existing [Rock in Opposition] fans", but added that for context "the uninitiated should probably experience the original Romantic Warriors II first". 

Achim Breiling wrote in a review at Babyblaue Seiten that the performances on the Special Features DVD shows how Rock in Opposition as a style of music has diversified since the movement was formed in the late 1970s. He said that the DVD is a great and very informative ("großartige und sehr aufschlussreiche") addition to the Romantic Warriors series.

Video performances
"Noise" by Aranis (Joris Vanvinckenroye) – 12:00
Performed at Madam Fortuna, Antwerp, Belgium in 2011
Joris Vanvinckenroye – contrabass
Liesbeth Lambrecht – violin
Marjolein Cools – accordion
Stijn Denys – guitar
Jana Arns – transverse flute
Dave Kerman – drums, percussion
Pierre Chevalier – piano
Live sound recording – Pieter Thys
Sound mix – Pieter Thys, Joris Vanvinckenroye
"Becchime" by Yugen (Francesco Zago) – 12:30
Performed at RIO Festival, Carmaux, France in 2011
Francesco Zago – guitar
Paolo Botta – keyboards
Maurizio Fasoli – piano
Valerio Cipollone – soprano saxophones, clarinets
Michele Salgarello – drums
Matteo Lorito – bass guitar
Jacopo Costa – marimba, vibraphone
Live sound recording – Mike Potter
Sound mix – Andrea Rizzardo
"Dead Silence" by Thinking Plague (Mike Johnson) – 4:50
Performed at Alexander Dawson Arts School, Colorado, US in 2011
Mike Johnson – guitars
Elaine DiFalco – vocals
Dave Willey – bass guitar
Mark Harris – saxophones, clarinets
Robin Chestnut – drums
Live sound recording – Jon Stubbs
Sound mix – Jon Stubbs, Mike Johnson
"Bug 2: A History of the United States" by Hamster Theatre (Dave Willey/Jon Stubbs) – 4:00
Performed at Alexander Dawson Arts School, Colorado, US in 2011
Dave Willey – accordion
Jon Stubs – keyboards
Mike Johnson – guitar
Mark Harris – winds, reeds
Raoul Rossiter – drums
Brian McDougall – bass guitar
Live sound recording – Jon Stubbs
Sound mix – Jon Stubbs, Dave Willey
"Ruins' Medley" by Ruins Alone (Tatsuya Yoshida) – 7:10
Performed at RIO Festival, Carmaux, France in 2011
Tatsuya Yoshida – drums
Live sound recording – Mike Potter
Sound mix – Mike Potter
"La Roche/Meeting Point" by Miriodor (Bernard Falaise/Pascal Globensky/Rémi Leclerc/Nicolas Masino) – 9:50
Performed at Sonic Circuits Festival, Washington, D.C., US in 2010
Pascal Globensky – keyboards
Pierre Labbé – saxophone, winds
Bernard Falaise – guitar
Rémi Leclerc – drums
Nicolas Masino – bass guitar, keyboards
Live sound recording – Mike Potter
Sound mix – Mike Potter
"Gianfranco Mattei" by Stormy Six (Paolo Fabbri/Franco Fabbri) – 5:30
Performed at Sesto San Giovanni, Milan, Italy in 2008
Carlo De Martini – violin
Tommaso Leddi – mandolin
Antonio Zanuso – drums
Pino Martini – bass guitar
Umberto Fioro – acoustic guitar, vocals
Franco Fabbri – electric guitar, vocals
Salvatore Garau – drums
Giorgio Casani – acoustic guitar, vocals
Massimo Villa – bass guitar
Sound engineer – Giorgio Albani
"Tiny Invasion" by Rabbit Rabbit (Carla Kihlstedt) – 4:31
Performed at Orion Sound Studios, Maryland, US in 2011
Carla Kihlstedt – violin, voice
Matthias Bossi – drums, percussion

Romantic Warriors series
Romantic Warriors: A Progressive Music Saga (2010)
Romantic Warriors II: A Progressive Music Saga About Rock in Opposition (2012)
Got RIO? Romantic Warriors II: Special Features DVD (2013)
Romantic Warriors III: Canterbury Tales (2015)
Got Canterbury? Romantic Warriors III: Special Features DVD? (2016)
Romantic Warriors IV: Krautrock Part 1 (2019)
Got Krautrock? Romantic Warriors IV: Special Features DVD Got Krautrock? (2020)
Romantic Warriors IV: Krautrock 2 (2021)
Got Krautrock 2? Romantic Warriors IV: Special Features DVD (2021)

References

External links
Official site

2013 films
2013 documentary films
Documentary films about rock music and musicians
Rock in Opposition